Gonatista major is a species of praying mantis native to the Caribbean and is found in Puerto Rico, Hispaniola, and perhaps elsewhere.  In comparing G. grisea and G. reticulata in 2008, an entomologist with the United States Department of Agriculture wrote:

See also
List of mantis genera and species

References

Mantidae
Mantodea of North America
Insects of the Caribbean
Insects of Puerto Rico
Insects of the Dominican Republic
Insects described in 1912